In mathematics, a 2-functor is a morphism between 2-categories. They may be defined formally using enrichment by saying that a 2-category is exactly a Cat-enriched category and a 2-functor is a Cat-functor.

Explicitly, if C and D are 2-categories then a 2-functor  consists of
 a function , and
 for each pair of objects  a functor  
such that each  strictly preserves identity objects and they commute with horizontal composition in C and D.

See  for more details and for lax versions.

References

Functors
Higher category theory